There have been a number of Mini concept cars, produced to show future ideas and forthcoming models at international motorshows.

Pre BMW era

9X (1967 to 1979)

From 1967 to 1979, Alec Issigonis worked on designing a replacement for the Mini in the form of an experimental model called the 9X. Due to politicking inside British Leyland (which had now been formed by the merger of BMC's parent company British Motor Holdings and the Leyland Motor Corporation), the car never reached production.

The 9X addressed many of the engineering flaws in Issigonis' original design- namely its complexity, its harsh ride and its poor mechanical refinement caused by the gearbox-in-sump layout. The first fully engineered prototype had a shorter wheelbase than the Mini but was four inches shorter overall. It was also slightly wider and offered significantly more interior space plus a hatchback body. The separate subframes of the Mini were removed and the body frame construction greatly simplified- the 9X required less than half the number of individual parts to build than a Mini.

The power unit was an all-new four-cylinder design with a belt-driven overhead camshaft. The crankcase and cylinder head were made from aluminium alloy while the block was of cast iron, with all three sections being held together by long through-bolts. This was identical construction to the original Austin Seven's engine and similar ideas would be revisited in the 1980s for the Rover K-Series engine. Capacity in the prototype was 1000cc with versions as low as 750cc possible, as well as six-cylinder versions which would still be compact enough to install transversely. Power output was 60 horsepower per litre (as opposed to around 40 hp/litre for the existing A-Series engine) and the new engine was also significantly lighter. To reduce maintenance and the number of parts the engine's alternator was incorporated into the flywheel (a common practice on motorcycles).

The gearbox was mounted behind and below the engine in a separate casing, rather than sharing the engine's sump oil. This reduced noise levels caused by the Mini's transmission transfer gears and allowed better control of drivetrain shunt and vibration.

The Hydrolastic suspension system developed by Alex Moulton was rejected in favour of a more conventional system with MacPherson struts at the front and a torsion beam axle at the back. This reduced production costs, potentially reduced warranty claim rates and allowed a more comfortable ride.

The 9X was, in essence, identical in concept to later European superminis such as the Fiat 127, the Peugeot 104, the Renault 5 and the Volkswagen Polo, but was conceived several years before the first of these cars was launched. Issigonis also drew up plans for a larger five-door 9X known as 10X on a 90-inch (2286mm) or 96-inch (2438mm) wheelbase against the three-door 80-inch (2036mm) wheelbase of the second built 9X prototype. This enlarged 10X version shared many structural, suspension and drivetrain parts with the 'Mini-sized' 9X and was Issigonis' proposal to succeed his own ADO16 design. Issigonis would also draw up comparisons based around an extended 9X measuring at 10ft 6-inches.

Project Ant - the Barrel Mini (1968)
Project Ant ran parallel to Issigonis 9X and was a plan to keep the same space efficiency but be cheaper to manufacturer, less complex and cut down on labour hours on either an eighty or eighty-four inch wheelbase. The project was cancelled in 1968, however it would still be part of a later design competition conducted between it and what became ADO74 (then known as Project Ladybird) between 1972 and 1974. Where though Project Ant gave a good account of itself especially when fitted with Allegro rear suspension, it was eventually decided albeit non-unanimously that what was needed was a supermini rather than a new Mini.

Mini Clubman (1967-68)
In 1967 Roy Haynes joined BMC from Ford Motor Company and was tasked by then Managing Director, Joe Edwards to update the existing Mini. Several designs were looked at including a booted version based upon the Riley / Wolseley Elf/Hornet and a hatchback with a rear end resembling a Morris Marina, which was also designed by Haynes. All of these were rejected except for the new front which was added to the existing Mini and named the Clubman.

Pininfarina Mini
In 1967 and 1968, Pininfarina designed two concept cars that were based on the BMC 1800 and 1100 models. These aerodynamic models were rejected by BMC, however there is evidence that BMC did a study to look at a mini version of this car without Pininfarina's assistance.

ADO74
In 1972 British Leyland began considering a replacement for the then 13-year-old Mini known initially as Project Ladybird. With the cancellation of the 9X under BMC the small car market had been left to the growing band of superminis which, as the 9X had done, took the Mini concept and improved on it.

The main improvement was from the realisation that the Mini's incredibly small size was not entirely necessary. Superminis were still much smaller than the usual small family car but were slightly larger than the Mini, which led to significantly more useful interior space without the need for the compromises in seating position, drivetrain refinement and low equipment levels that the Mini used to create its spacious but small interior. The Italian engineer Dante Giacosa had long been Issigonis' main rival when it came to mastery of small car design and his transverse (but no gearbox-in-sump) engine layout and the addition of a hatchback (both ideas that Issigonis had himself seen as a way of improving the Mini on the 9X) provided the template for the new generation of superminis.

British Leyland now had to catch up with the market. The ADO74 project considered various proposed car sizes, from a direct Mini replacement, a more conventional supermini and a compact saloon. Unsurprisingly the mid-sized option was chosen and styling proposals were drawn up by Harris Mann and Giovanni Michelotti, with Mann's design going forward. The result was over 15 inches longer than the Mini, with a wheelbase 10 inches longer. Like the 9X (and most of its would-be competitors) the ADO74 used MacPherson strut front suspension, but with independent trailing arms at the rear, akin to the contemporary Honda Civic. Power was to have come from the proposed H-Series later K-Series engines, which were all-new designs  that owed little to the A-Series engine though it could have just as easily been built with the A-Series initially due to the company's financial state. 

The ADO74 project progressed slowly - partly due to continuing corporate problems at BL and partly due to the need for numerous design changes requested by the firm's overseas sales division, Leyland International, which took the view that the ADO74 was too conventional and that it would be better to create another innovative car rather than compete directly with the established competition. The supermini market moved quickly in the early 'Seventies and the ADO74 underwent several redesigned to keep abreast of these changes in order that it wouldn't be outdated as soon as it was released. Eventually these changes became so significant that BL realized that it would be better to start from scratch. The ADO74 project was cancelled in 1973 and the ADO88 project took its place.

ADO88
This was a 'clean sheet' design using all the knowledge gained from the cancelled ADO74 proposal, with Charles 'Spen' King in overall charge. The new car was sized to be smaller than the established superminis but larger than a Mini to allow useful improvements in refinement, practicality and safety that the market demanded. With the Mini's superb interior space for its size still one of the ageing model's key selling points the brief for ADO88 was that the car had to offer the same usable cabin volume as the competition but in a car with smaller external dimensions.

Budget restrictions meant that there would be no new power units for the ADO88, which would instead use the familiar A-Series units from the Mini, along with the old car's gearbox-in-sump transmission. Tests showed that despite its age the engine could still deliver highly competitive fuel economy so it was modernised and updated to create the A-Plus generation. The conventional suspension of the 9X and the ADO74, and the Mini's solid rubber cone springs, were replaced by the Hydragas system recently debuted on the Austin Allegro which offered a useful improvement in ride quality as well as being much more compact than a standard steel spring and damper setup, which was crucial to provide the car with the required interior space.

That requirement also led to the ADO88, despite the efforts of Harris Mann. having an inevitably boxy appearance, with an almost vertical rear hatch (similar in appearance to the later Fiat Cinquecento). This style was received very poorly in customer clinics and the project was renamed LC8 with the aim of providing a more upmarket style and appearance to make the car more competitive. Having originally been intended as a complete Mini replacement, LC8 would now become a separate car in its own right to replace the higher-end Clubman and 1275GT Mini models while the more basic Minis would continue (with some of the improvements from the ADO88 project such as the A-Plus engine and front disc brakes) as a budget model. The LC8 became the Austin Metro, which was initially launched in 1980 as the Austin Mini-Metro to signify its status as a supplement to the Mini range rather than a replacement.

1994 to present

Mini Spiritual and Spiritual Too (1997)
At the 1997 Geneva Motor Show, BMW and Rover revealed two Mini concepts called the Spiritual and Spiritual Too. Compared to the ACV30, it showed a potential non-retro design for the forthcoming new Mini, which was designed by Oliver Le Grice. The cars were compact and clever, with the Spiritual featuring a rear-engined 60 hp 800 cc 3-cylinder version of the K-Series engine while Spiritual Too was to use a 1.1-litre 4-cylinder K-Series as well as the latest version of Alex Moulton's Hydragas suspension system to maximise interior space; this was claimed to be more of the heart of the mini instead of retro.

Mini ACV30 (1997)
Rover first showed its ideas for a modern Mini in the form of the ACV30 concept car in 1997 created to celebrate the 30th anniversary of Mini's win at the 1967 Monte Carlo Rally with ACV standing for Anniversary Concept Vehicle.

Based on the mid-engined, rear wheel drive MG F, the ACV30 featured several elements that influenced the eventual new Mini of 2001 such as the black a-pillars, chunky wheel arch detailing and white roof. The concept was attributed to the BMW designer Adrian van Hooydonk and Frank Stephenson, but the research work began at the end of 1995, with a collaboration with the Transportation design course of the IED in TurinIED it. In particular, the project of the Sicilian designer Salvatore Catalano was acquired in July 1996 by Rover and chosen for the development of the concept and some ideas found application in the development of the Mini which subsequently went into production.

2000 Paris Motor Show
Before the first sales of the new generation Mini in 2001, prototype versions were shown at the 2000 Paris Motor Show. These were essentially identical to the version that was finally sold except that the colours used ('Candy Blue' and 'Flamenco Orange') have never been used in production.

Mini Hydrogen concept (2001)
Mini showcased a hydrogen-powered concept car in 2001 at the Frankfurt Auto Show. The car differs from electric-motor hydrogen concepts, such as the Honda FCX in that it uses a cylinder-based internal combustion engine based on the existing 1.6-litre petrol Mini.

Mini Traveller (2005)

At the 2005 Frankfurt Motor Show Mini revealed a retro version of the classic "Mini Traveller" estate car. The Traveller concept had a stretched wheelbase, two side-hinged rear doors, and separate rear seats replacing the split bench seat of the standard Mini. At the Tokyo Auto Show, the same basic concept reappeared with some fanciful additions – a circular roof section that could be removed to form a picnic table with four folding chairs. The rear side windows were replaced with fold-down storage containers containing cutlery, cups and plates. A further version was presented at the Detroit without the table and chairs but with a radically restyled interior.  Ultimately, a production version of the Traveller concept vehicle appeared during the 2008 model year as the Mini Clubman.

Mini Crossover (2008)
The Mini Crossover Concept was unveiled in 2008 at the Paris Motor Show. Inside, it had a large glass ball in the centre of the instrument panel, called the 'Mini Centre Globe'; this system incorporated laser projection technology for 3D navigational routes and films. A production vehicle based on the Crossover Concept was launched in 2010 as the Mini Countryman.

Mini Coupé (2009)
The Mini Coupé concept vehicle was unveiled in 2009 at the Frankfurt Motor Show. It had a 2-seat coupé body, and incorporated the engine from the Mini John Cooper Works, and the chrome radiator grille from the Cooper S (but with the inner sections of the grille finished in the body colour). It had a luggage capacity of 250 litres.

BMW subsequently announced that the Mini Coupé would go into production, with assembly to take place in Oxford.

Mini Beachcomber (2009)

On 16 December 2009, Mini revealed the Beachcomber Concept, which drew heavily on the Moke styling while still being packed with modern equipment. The Beachcomber Concept was based on the forthcoming Countryman all-wheel drive platform, and made its public debut at the Detroit Auto Show in January 2010.

Mini Paceman (2011)

The three-door Paceman concept was announced in January 2011 at the Detroit Auto Show, Mini's 10th anniversary in the US market. Designed by Gert Hildebrand, it was based on the recently launched Countryman, with a similar interior, and range of options and drivetrains, including the ALL4 permanent all-wheel drive system. From the screen rearwards, the Paceman features an entirely new exterior borrowing design features of the 2009 Mini Coupe Concept and is 4110mm long.

The concept car was shown with the most powerful engine in the Mini range: the John Cooper Works 1.6-litre twin-scroll turbocharged engine, with 211 hp and maximum torque of 260 Nm, with an overboost maximum of 280 Nm. Production was mooted to commence in 2012, and Mini's marketing materials referred to it as the first "Sports Activity Coupe".

Mini Rocketman (2011)

The Mini Rocketman concept was first shown to the public at the 2011 Geneva Motor Show. It is a smaller three-door hatchback, about a foot shorter than the Mini Hatch. The Rocketman features a panoramic glass roof etched with the Union Flag. It is not much bigger than the original Mini, has an unusual cantilevered door design and a carbon spaceframe construction.

Yahoo! described the Rocketman as 'the weirdest concept Mini yet'. It was expected that the concept car would reach production, but in early 2012 it was confirmed that the car would remain a concept only.

Mini Clubvan (2012)
The Mini Clubvan was shown for the first time at the 2012 Geneva Motor Show. Based on the existing Mini Clubman, it is the first time Mini made a light commercial van in 30 years since the demise of the original Mini Van in 1982.

Mini Vision (2013)
The Mini Vision was first shown in Germany in July 2013, and anticipated the design evolution of the forthcoming 2014 Mini.

Mini Clubman (2014)

The Mini Clubman concept is the longest and widest car designed by Mini, bigger than the production Countryman. It was unveiled at the 2014 Geneva Motor Show, and is considered to anticipate the design of the future Clubman model.

Vision GT
In June 2014, it was announced that Mini would be creating a new concept car for the video game Gran Turismo 6.

Mini Superleggera Vision (2014) 
In 2014 Mini debuted the Mini Superleggera Vision Concept in collaboration with Carrozzeria Touring Superleggera at the Concorso d'Eleganza Villa d'Este.

Electric Concept 

The Electric Concept was presented during IAA 2017 in Frankfurt. It's a preview of a fully electric production model.

John Cooper Works GP Concept 

The John Cooper Works GP Concept was presented during IAA 2017 in Frankfurt.

Vision Urbanaut Concept 
The MINI brand has used #NEXTGen to present, in a world exclusive, the MINI Vision Urbanaut - an all-new interpretation of a vision of space. This digital vision vehicle offers more interior space and versatility than ever before, but still on a minimal footprint.

References

External links

 Official international Mini website

Mini (marque)
Concept cars